Jordan Bouah (born May 17, 1995) is an Italian wide receiver for the Vienna Vikings of the European League of Football. Born in Rome, he was drafted in the first round of the 2019 CFL European Draft by the Ottawa Redblacks. He played College football for the Saddleback Bobcats.

Early life
Bouah was born in Rome to an Ivorian father and a Sardinian mother. After playing basketball throughout his childhood, he became interested in American football after watching the Super Bowl in 2015.

College career
Bouah joined the Rome Gladiators before attending Saddleback College in California for two years. Before and during this time, he also played for the Italy national American football team, winning the European Championship in 2021.

Professional career

Ottawa Redblacks
Bouah was selected by the Ottawa Redblacks with the 8th overall pick of the 2019 CFL European Draft. He was released after playing in just one preseason game. He remained on the practice squad.

Dresden Monarchs
Bouah then played for the Dresden Monarchs in the German Football League in the 2019 season. In the final six games of the season, he had 10 receptions for 145 yards and three touchdowns while also returning kicks.

Seamen Milano 
In 2020 and 2021, Bouah played for the Seamen Milano in the Italian Football League. He helped the Seamen reach the 2021 league championship game losing in overtime to the Parma Panthers. In 2021 eight regular season games, Bouah had 29 receptions for 527 yards, nine touchdowns and rushed for 29 yards and one touchdown.

Vienna Vikings
On February 5, 2022, the Vienna Vikings announced the signing as an E-Import player for the 2022 European League of Football season.

References

External links
Saddleback College bio
CFL.ca bio

1995 births
Living people
Italian expatriate sportspeople in Canada
Italian players of American football
Sportspeople from Rome
American football wide receivers
Ottawa Redblacks players
Expatriate players of American football
Players of American football from California
Vienna Vikings players
Italian people of Ivorian descent
Italian expatriate sportspeople in Germany
Italian expatriate sportspeople in Austria
Saddleback Gauchos football players
Italian expatriate sportspeople in the United States